Lymington Town may refer to:

 Lymington, a town in Hampshire, England
 Lymington Town F.C.
 Lymington Town railway station